Wildwood is a hamlet in west-central Alberta, Canada within Yellowhead County. The Lobstick River, which flows from Chip Lake to the west, runs through the hamlet.

Statistics Canada recognizes Wildwood as a designated place.

History 
Originally named Junkins, Wildwood was established in 1908 by a group of 20 African-American immigrants as a block settlement. The new Black Canadian homesteaders arrived from Oklahoma and Texas, just three years after Alberta became a province in 1905. The railway arrived in Junkins in 1908.  People arriving at "end of steel" transferred their goods to wagons and travelled to their homesteads.

Demographics 

See also 
List of communities in Alberta
List of designated places in Alberta
List of former urban municipalities in Alberta
List of hamlets in Alberta
Similar 1908 to 1910 Alberta homesteader settlements of  Black Canadians:
Amber Valley, Alberta
Campsie, Alberta
Keystone (now Breton), Alberta

References 

Black Canadian culture in Alberta
Black Canadian settlements
Designated places in Alberta
Former villages in Alberta
Hamlets in Alberta
Yellowhead County
Populated places disestablished in 1990
Populated places established by African Americans